Shiqi Station is an elevated station of Line 4 of the Guangzhou Metro in Guangzhou, China. It started operations on 30 December 2006. It is located at the junction of Shilian Road and Jingzhu Expressway in Shiqi Town, Panyu District.

Station layout

Exits

References

Railway stations in China opened in 2006
Guangzhou Metro stations in Panyu District